The Rizzuto crime family is an organized crime family based in Montreal, Quebec, Canada, whose criminal activity covers most of southern Quebec and Ontario. The United States Federal Bureau of Investigation (FBI) considers the family a faction of the Bonanno crime family, while Canadian and most other international law enforcement agencies recognize it as an independent crime family. The Rizzuto family is sometimes referred to as the Sixth Family.

Nicolo Rizzuto, a Sicilian immigrant from Cattolica Eraclea, established the organization in the 1970s as part of the Sicilian faction of the Montreal Cotroni crime family. An internal war broke out by the late 1970s which resulted in the death of acting captain Paolo Violi and his brothers, allowing the Rizzutos to overtake the Cotronis as the preeminent crime family in Montreal. Nicolo quickly rose through the ranks of organized crime in Montreal, earning the nickname 'The Canadian Godfather' and 'boss of the Mafia in Canada' from international organized crime expert Antonio Nicaso.

Nicolo's son Vito Rizzuto was indicted in 2004 and imprisoned from 2007 until 2012 for murders in which he participated in 1981, causing a power struggle among criminals in Montreal. During Vito's imprisonment, his son Nicolo Jr. was killed in 2009, and Nicolo Sr. was shot by a sniper while in his home in 2010. Upon Vito's release, several people were killed in what was suspected to be retaliation for the murders of his family. Vito died of natural causes in 2013, and the head of the Mafia in Montreal is now assumed to be his son Leonardo.

Overtaking of the Cotroni family
Nicolo Rizzuto married Libertina Manno during the early 1940s, the daughter of a Sicilian Mafia leader, Antonio Manno. Rizzuto emigrated from Sicily with his family to Montreal in 1954.

In the 1970s, Rizzuto was an underling in the Sicilian faction, led by Luigi Greco until his death in 1972, of the Calabrian Cotroni crime family. As tension then grew into a power struggle between the Calabrian and Sicilian factions of the family, a mob war began in 1973. In 1977, Rizzuto and Cotroni capodecina Paolo Violi met face-to-face in the home of a Montreal resident for a last-ditch effort to resolve their differences, according to a police report. But the peace talks failed, and most of the Rizzuto family fled to Venezuela. This led to a violent Mafia war in Montreal which resulted in the deaths of Violi and his brothers, along with others, spanning the mid-1970s to the early 1980s until the war ceased. Antonio Manno's son Domenico was also instrumental in Violi's murder. He received a seven-year sentence after pleading guilty to conspiring to kill Violi; Rizzuto confidant Agostino Cuntrera received a five-year sentence in relation to Violi's murder. By the mid 1980s, the Rizzuto crime family emerged as Montreal's pre-eminent crime family after the turf war.

Nicolo's son, Vito, later followed him into the Mafia. He kept a low profile, working only with trusted people close to the family. They worked with the Cuntrera-Caruana Mafia clan, Colombian and Venezuelan drug cartels, and the Bonanno crime family in New York City. Gerlando Sciascia was a Bonanno caporegime that served as a representative for the Rizzutos. Rizzuto was the mediator who oversaw the peace among the Hells Angels, the Mafia, street gangs, Colombian cartels, and the Irish mobs such as the West End Gang.

Canadian Mafia journalists Lee Lamothe and Adrian Humphreys dubbed the Rizzuto clan the Sixth Family to describe them on an equal footing with the Five Families of Cosa Nostra in New York. According to the book The Sixth Family:

Power vacuum after Vito's arrest
After consolidation of their power in the 1990s, the Rizzutos became over-exposed and over-extended. Vito Rizzuto was arrested on January 20, 2004, in Montreal, for his involvement in the May 5, 1981, gangland killings of three rival Bonanno crime family captains (Alphonse Indelicato, Philip Giaccone and Dominick Trinchera) and was sentenced to a 10-year prison sentence on May 4, 2007.

Lorenzo Giordano, a loyalist to Francesco Arcadi, shot convicted heroin dealer Javal Mohammad Novarian in the groin on April 18, 2005.

In 2005, a 300 kilogram shipment of a total 1,300 kilograms of cocaine, co-organized by Rizzuto family confidant, Francesco Del Balso and West End Gang member, Richard Griffin, was intercepted in Boucherville, Quebec, by police. After Griffin invested $1.5 million in the purchase and transportation of the cocaine, he demanded $350,000 from the Rizzutos for not taking preventative measures in transporting the drugs. After arguments about the debts, Griffin was riddled with gunfire outside his home in Notre-Dame-de-Grâce on July 12, 2006. On August 30, 2006, 35-year old Domenico Macri, a Rizzuto family enforcer and protégé of Francesco Del Balso, was murdered in a drive-by shooting as he waited at a traffic light in his Cadillac car in downtown Montreal. On November 22, 2006, the senior leadership of the criminal organization was hit by the largest RCMP operation in Canadian history, named Project Colisée, lasting four years; the RCMP had fitted the Rizzutos' headquarters, the Consenza Social Club, with microphones and cameras to amass sufficient evidence against the organization. Among the 90 people arrested were Nicolo Rizzuto, father of Vito Rizzuto, Paolo Renda, Vito Rizzuto's brother-in-law, Rocco Sollecito, Francesco Arcadi, Lorenzo Giordano and Francesco Del Balso.

On September 7–12, 2007, 56-year old Francesco "Frank" Velenosi, an associate of capo Francesco Arcadi, was found in the trunk of his Volvo car, stabbed to death.

On January 15, 2008, Constantin "Big Gus" Alevizos, an associate of Gaetano "Guy" Panepinto before his murder in October 2000, was shot and killed outside of a halfway house in Brampton, Ontario. He was serving 3 years imprisonment since February 2007 for his role in a drug conspiracy. He was accused of stealing $600,000 from the Rizzuto family following Panepinto's murder. A 2001 attempted hit was foiled after Juan "Joe Bravo" Fernandez gave a gun and ammunition to an undercover police agent. Alevizos, 6ft6 and weighing over 460 pounds, was shot in the back and abdomen and was pronounced dead at a nearby hospital.

On December 4, 2008, 40-year old Rizzuto family soldier Mario "Skinny" Marabella, was kidnapped at a gas station on Autoroute 440 in Laval, Quebec. He was forced into a minivan and his car was later found in flames in Montreal. Marabella had several convictions for loansharking, breaking probation and extortion. In 1992, he and Giuseppe De Vito robbed a liquor truck. He pleaded guilty to possessing stolen goods and received a 90-day sentence.

On January 16, 2009, 37-year old Sam Fasulo was shot and killed, a convicted heroin and crack-cocaine dealer, who had close ties to Francesco Arcadi. In 2004, he was sentenced to 4 years in prison for his role in a drug trafficking ring that operated out of Italian cafés in St. Léonard and St. Michel. Fasulo was shot several times while driving in North Montreal and died in hospital two days later from his wounds.

On August 21, 2009, family associate, Federico del Peschio was killed behind La Cantina restaurant in Ahuntsic. On December 28, 2009, Nick Rizzuto Jr., son of Vito Rizzuto, was shot and killed near his car in Notre-Dame-de-Grâce, a borough in Montreal. The killing of Nick Jr. – the face of the organization on the street – illustrated the power vacuum within the upper ranks of Montreal organized crime. Since the slaying of Vito Rizzuto's son, the organization suffered other major setbacks. 70-year old Paolo Renda, the consigliere of the Rizzuto crime family, disappeared on May 20, 2010. A month later 66-year old Agostino Cuntrera, the presumed acting boss who was believed to have taken control of the family, was killed together with his bodyguard 44-year old Liborio Sciascia on June 30, 2010. After three decades of relative stability, the face of the city's Mafia hierarchy was subject to a major management shuffle. 36-year old Ennio Bruni, former Rizzuto family enforcer and bodyguard to Francesco Del Balso, was shot and killed around 3:15am outside of Café Bellerose in Vimont, Quebec, on September 29, 2010. Bruni previously managed to escape an assassination attempt on his life on November 24, 2009, after he was shot three times in the shoulder and once in the back shortly after his departure from a restaurant in Laval. On November 10, 2010, Nicolo Rizzuto was killed at his residence in the Cartierville borough of Montreal when a single bullet from a sniper's rifle punched through double-paned glass of the rear patio doors of his mansion; he was 86. His death is believed to have been the final blow against the Rizzuto crime family.

Calabrese mobsters led by the old Cotroni family were among the suspects for the murders of Rizzuto crime family members. The Rizzutos have dominated organized crime activities in Montreal since its inception and now their weakened organization is being challenged for control of rackets in the area, most notably the drug trade. An associate of capo Francesco Arcadi and Francesco Del Balso, 44-year old Antonio Di Salvo, was shot and killed at his home in Rivière-des-Prairies, Quebec, on January 31, 2011. On October 24, 2011, Rizzuto crime family associate-turned rival 40-year old Lorenzo "Larry" Lopresti, the son of Joe Lopresti who was gunned down in April 1992, was shot and killed on his ground-floor balcony and pronounced dead at the scene. His murder was confirmed as the 31st homicide in Montreal in 2011. Salvatore Montagna, the acting boss of the Bonanno family until his deportation to Canada in 2009, was believed to be attempting to reorganize both families under his control; however, he was murdered in November 2011.

On March 1, 2012, 38-year old Giuseppe "Joe Closure" Colapelle, was shot inside of his parked car in North Montreal and later pronounced dead upon arrival of the hospital. It is believed Colapelle worked for Giuseppe De Vito, a former Rizzuto family lieutenant who was ousted after attempting to overthrow the Rizzuto family in around 2009–2010. Colapelle allegedly served as a double-agent for Raynald Desjardins and was spying on Salvatore Montagna by mid-2011. On May 4, 2012, 53-year old Giuseppe "Joe" Renda was kidnapped and never seen again. Renda met with Antonio Pietranto and Montagna two days before the failed assassination attempt on Desjardins on September 16, 2011, Renda allegedly gave Montagna his full support in taking control of the Italian-Montreal underworld. Walter Gutierrez, a money launderer for the Rizzuto family, was shot to death in West Montreal on July 16, 2012. Vito Rizzuto was released from prison on October 5, 2012. On November 5, 2012, Rizzuto family confidant-turned rival 70-year old Giuseppe "Smiling Joe" Di Maulo was executed by a hitman waiting outside his home in Blainville, Quebec. Di Maulo allegedly attended the election of Philip Rastelli as the Bonanno family boss in 1973 with Desjardins and Paolo Violi, it also noted that he was the brother-in-law of Desjardins. On December 8, 2012, Rizzuto family lieutenant 50-year old Emilio Cordileone was gunned down in Ahuntsic, near his parked car. His murder was verified as Montreal's 33rd homicide in 2012. Cordileone's murder was possibly the result of his association with Giuseppe De Vito and the Cotroni crime family.

On May 8, 2013, 57-year old Juan "Joe Bravo" Fernandez and his associate 36-year old Fernando Pimentel, considered neutral in the Rizzuto war, were both found murdered in a garbage dump in Casteldaccia, Palermo, his body was burnt and riddled with over 30 bullets. His associate allegedly arrived in Sicily in March. Law enforcement considered the hit to be ordered by Vito Rizzuto. Bravo was deported from Canada to Sicily in 2012. Giuseppe Carbone, Pietro and Salvatore Scaduto were convicted for the April 9th murder. Carbone led the police to the whereabouts in May, he became a cooperating witness and was sentenced to 16 years in prison.

On July 8, 2013, 46-year old Giuseppe De Vito, ally of Desjardins, was fatally poisoned in his cell at Donnacona federal penitentiary. De Vito was targeted by law enforcement in 2006 as part of "Operation Coliseum". He was serving a 15-year prison sentence for conspiracy to import cocaine and gangsterism charges following his conviction in 2010. His murder is believed to be orchestrated by Vito Rizzuto. On July 12, 2013, 41-year old Salvatore Calautti was shot in the head and killed while driving in Vaughan, Ontario. His associate, 35-year old Jimmy Tusek, was shot in the chest and stomach. The killing of Calautti is believed to be revenge for the murder of Vito Rizzuto associate Gaetano Panepinto in October 2000 and Nicolo Rizzuto, Sr. in November 2010. It is noted he also had ties to the 'Ndrangheta organisation in Canada.

On November 10, 2013, 67-year old Moreno "The Turkey" Gallo, a once-influential member of the crime family, was killed by a gunman inside an Italian restaurant in the Mexican city of Acapulco. He had lived in Canada throughout the 1950s but was deported in January 2013 after the Canadian government formally accused him of murder and organized crime charges. The murder of Gallo is believed to have marked the three-year anniversary of the murder of Nicolo Rizzuto, Sr. on November 10, 2010. It is suspected Gallo was killed as a consequence of aligning with Desjardins and attempting to overthrow the Rizzuto family around 2009–2010.

Events following Vito's death
Five days before the death of Rizzuto, on December 18, 2013, 54-year old Roger Valiquette Jr., a loan shark and Raynald Desjardins ally who also had ties to Joe Di Maulo, was gunned down in the parking lot of a restaurant in Laval. Vito Rizzuto died of natural causes on December 23, 2013. After his release from prison, Rizzuto had been on a revenge campaign which the Rizzuto crime family continued after his death. Several members and associates of the Cotroni family were murdered as a result.

In April 2014, Carmine Verduci was shot to death outside a cafe; it is believed he was encroaching on the Rizzutos' turf following Vito's death. On August 1, 2014, 46-year old Ducarme Joseph, leader of the Haitian-based street gang "the 67s", was shot multiple times in the upper body on the streets of Saint-Michel, Montreal and was pronounced dead when paramedics arrived. Sources claimed his murder was retribution for his involvement in the murder of Nick Rizzuto Jr. in December 2009, the son of Vito Rizzuto. The 67s gang formed in the Saint-Michel district of Montreal, Quebec, Canada in the late 1980s and are associated with the Crips gang. Police believed Joseph drove the getaway car in the Rizzuto murder. It is alleged the Rizzuto family offered $200,000 for the death of Joseph. His boutique shop on Saint Jacques Street was shot at on March 18, 2010. Joseph managed to flee however his bodyguard and associate 27-year old Peter Christopoulos, and the store manager 60-year old Jean Gaston, were killed. He was arrested on March 19 on charges of assault and the possession of a firearm silencer, and he was sentenced to 10 months in April 2010.

In November 2015, Vito Rizzuto's son, Leonardo Rizzuto, along with Rocco Sollecito's son, Stefano Sollecito, believed to be the heads of the Mafia in Montreal, were arrested along with more than 40 other people, and were charged with taking part in a conspiracy to traffic in drugs between January 1, 2013, and November 16, 2015. They were also charged with committing a crime "for the benefit of, at the direction of, or in association with, a criminal organization." As part of the same operation, the police charged Maurice Boucher with ordering the failed assassination plot on Desjardins from his prison cell.

On March 1, 2016, 52-year old Lorenzo Giordano, a highly respected Rizzuto lieutenant and confidant who had expressed wishes to become the next boss of the Rizzuto family, was shot to death in a Chomedey, Quebec, parking lot. On May 27, 2016, 67-year old Rocco Sollecito was shot to death while driving in Laval. Sollecito was an underboss of the family and his death was believed to be part of a dismantling of the older generation of the family. On June 2, 2016, semi-retired Rizzuto family member, 72-year old Angelo D'Onofrio, was shot several times at close range inside of Café Sinatra by a young male.

On October 15, 2016, 65-year old Vincenzo Spagnolo, considered formerly as a mediator, messenger and advisor to Vito Rizzuto, was shot multiple times at his home in Vimont, Quebec, and pronounced dead. Spagnolo was close to the Sicilian faction of the family following Rizzuto's death in 2013.

In December 2016, Desjardins received a 14-year prison sentence, including time served, for connection to the murder of Salvatore Montagna in November 2011.

On January 30, 2017, 39-year old Anastasios Leventis, a former computer technician and enforcer associated with the Rizzuto crime family, was shot to death in Toronto, two firearms were recovered close to the scene of the homicide. He pleaded guilty to conspiracy charges and marijuana-smuggling in 2009 as part of "Project Cancun" and was sentenced to 6-months in prison. A court document issued in 2009 considered Leventis the main marijuana supplier in the operation.

On August 17, 2017, 45-year old Antonio De Blasio, a Rizzuto family soldier and Sollecito crew member, was gunned down outside his son's football practice in St. Leonard, Quebec. He was shot several times in the upper body. De Blasio's murder was confirmed as Montreal's 15th homicide in 2017.

Jacques Desjardins, brother of Raynald, disappeared on November 2–3, 2017, and is presumed dead.

On February 3, 2018, 33-year old Daniele Ranieri was found in a ditch in Cancún, Mexico. He was shot twice in the back of the head. Law enforcement alleged Ranieri took over the Toronto crew on behalf of the Rizzuto crime family following the April 2013 murder of Joe Bravo. Ranieri fled to Mexico in 2015 following an indictment on extortion charges issued by the York Regional Police. He previously served three prison-stints for robbery, assault, bookmaking and firearm offenses.

On February 19, 2018, Leonardo Rizzuto and Stefano Sollecito were released from prison since their November 2015 arrest, and acquitted of charges of gangsterism and conspiracy to traffic cocaine. The wiretap evidence that was gathered by a joint police task force in 2015 was excluded as a violation of the constitutional right to solicitor-client privilege.

A 2019 CBC News report later quoted a Mafia expert as stating that "Rizzuto's death paved the way for upheaval in the underworld. There's a power struggle left from the vacuum from Rizzuto". On October 17, 2019, Jonathan Massari, Dominico Scarfo, Guy Dion and Marie-Josée Viau, were arrested and charged with planning and executing the murders of Sollecito and Giordano.

The power vacuum after Rizutto's death was particularly apparent to mobsters from the area of Hamilton, Ontario. Angelo Musitano, boss of the city's Musitano crime family, was killed in May 2017. In April 2019, his uncle Tony Musitano died of natural causes, leaving nephew Pasquale (Pat) Musitano as the last of the dynasty. "Those deaths cost [Pat] protection in a world where he had a growing number of enemies", according to journalist Peter Edwards. The enemies included "criminal groups in Hamilton, Buffalo, Montreal and elsewhere, including the Luppino and Papalia crime gangs," according to the National Post. 

Shortly after Angelo's murder, Pat Musitano's home was sprayed with bullets, and shortly after Tony's death in April 2019, Pat was shot but survived. At that time, CBC News discussed other mob hits and stated that the "surge" in violence appeared to have commenced after Vito Rizzuto's death; "the Musitano family [for example] was aligned with Rizzuto, which offered protection". In July 2020, Pat Musitano was killed.

On November 10, 2021, Serafino Olivero, an independent money launderer closely connected to the Rizzuto organization, survived a drive-by assassination attempt in Montreal's Riviere-des-Prairies neighbourhood. Olivero had been fined $75,000 by Revenu Quebec in 2018 for producing false tax returns. It is possible that Olivero had fallen from the good graces of the Rizzuto family and was targeted as a result.

On February 9, 2022, 46-year old Domenico Macri was murdered in his garage in the LaSalle neighbourhood of Montreal during a drive-by shooting. Macri was the owner of a local sports bar, named Brasserie des Rapides. Macri is believed to have been involved in the illegal sports betting business and had connections to the Italian Mafia in Montreal and the West End Gang.

On March 15, 2023, Leonardo Rizzuto was shot at six times while driving on Autoroute 440 in Laval, escaping with minor injury.

In popular culture
Writers Antonio Nicaso and Peter Edwards published Business or Blood, a history of the family, in 2015. The book was adapted into the television drama series Bad Blood, which debuted on Citytv in 2017.

References

Sources

 

 
 
Organized crime in Montreal